is a town located in Aki District, Hiroshima Prefecture, Japan.

As of May 1, 2017, the town has an estimated population of 52,056 and a density of 5,000 persons per km². The total area is 10.45 km².

It has the headquarters of Mazda.

References

External links

Fuchū official website 

Towns in Hiroshima Prefecture